Totteridge Green is a five hectare Site of Borough Importance for Nature Conservation, Grade II, in Totteridge in the London Borough of Barnet. It is also registered common land. 

The nature reserve is the land on both sides of the road, Totteridge Green. A typical English village green, it comprises open grassland, small pockets of scrubby woodland and a pond.

Much of the grassland is dominated by perennial rye-grass, with a good diversity of common wild flowers, and there are also areas of dry acid grassland. Several damp hollows, probably former ponds, contain tussocky grassland with uncommon wild flowers such as great burnet, bog stitchwort and common marsh-bedstraw. A map of the 1840s shows fourteen ponds, but only Laurel Farm Pond survives. This is frequented by large numbers of geese and mallards. Trees include pedunculate oak, beech and horse chestnut. 

The site includes a short footpath through woods to Coppice Walk, and there is also access from Totteridge Village and Laurel Way. A footpath which starts next to Laurel Farm Pond goes through Folly Brook Valley to Woodside Park.

Totteridge Croft Field (or Dell's Down Acre)
Totteridge Croft Field is a  Site of Borough Importance for Nature Conservation, Grade I, between Totteridge Green and Darland's Lake at Grid Ref . It is a field bounded by tall unmanaged hedges on unimproved clay grassland. It appears to have been a hay meadow in the past which is now reverting to rough grassland and scrub. Much of the field is covered with tufted hair-grass, and it has scattered oak and crab apple trees and a good variety of wild flowers. There are some uncommon species, such as sneezewort and pignut. The field provides a good habitat for birds and cover for mammals such as rabbits and muntjac. It is private land with no public access.

Gallery

See also

 Nature reserves in Barnet

References

Further reading

Nature reserves in the London Borough of Barnet
Common land in London
Totteridge